The Plymouth-Banjul Challenge or unofficially the Ultimate Banger Challenge and previously known as the Plymouth-Dakar Challenge, is an annual car event for charity. It is not a race or a competition as its website states. It was first run in 2003  to Dakar and since 2005 to Banjul. It very roughly follows the route of the more famous Dakar Rally, visiting many of the same countries.

Participants starting in Europe normally must go to Tarifa in Southern Spain. Then the course runs through Morocco, Western Sahara, Mauritania, Senegal and finally into the Gambia. The entrants must be driving a car worth approximately £100.

Participants in the challenge are on their own, meaning that no assistance is rendered to motorists in case of a car breakdown or even if they become stranded.  

Mechanical reliability is the main obstacle to completing the course given that such vehicles are ordinary road cars and are mostly at the end of their useful lifetimes.
Many cars cope very well until they have to go through the desert and then almost all suffer a great deal due to high temperatures and dust.
Once the cars make it to Banjul in Gambia they are auctioned for, or donated to, charity.

History and notable entrants
Amongst the many cars that have taken part in the challenge was the fine Peugeot 505 family estate that went on to be auctioned at the end of the rally for several times the amount of money it would have commanded back in the UK. The 2006 rally included a 1983 BMW 732i which appeared to be incapable of making it out of England  but in fact did complete the course; a Fiat Uno which performed fantastically and even pushed the previously mentioned BMW up a mountain; some Renault 19s and a VW Beetle.  In addition a number of 4x4 vehicles regularly enter ranging from quite reasonable vehicles that 'bend' the entry rules to vehicles over 40 years old rebuilt from wrecks just for the challenge.

The 2004 event had one team, The Idiots Abroad, tow a trailer with two motorbikes on it through the desert - the challenge has now been laid down for another team to get a trailer through the desert and in 2006 two ambulances made it across.

In the 2004/2005 event, a Swiss Team (Team Pintpullers) drove a Mercedes Van and a 125cc motorbike from Switzerland to Banjul. The Bike was ridden the entire time and reached Banjul where it was donated to the local police.

Also attending in 2004/5 was the Porsche 924 of Nick Gibbs and Simon Laidlaw, they documented their journey in a DVD called Porsche'd to the Limit- Conquering the Sahara in a £300 924.

There are even people who cannot drive taking part with one half of a Fiat Uno team learning to drive in the desert where he managed to crash it into a Welsh Ambulance and two Canadians who bought a manual car in France and spent the next few weeks learning to drive it.

Since 2007, the rally also has a group of cars continuing on to Bamako, Mali.
The 2009/2010 Banjul Challenge was called off by its organiser Julian Nowill due to Mauritanian security concerns (French tourist murders and Spanish aid workers kidnappings), but two teams from group 1 and three teams from group 3 pushed on regardless.

Team midlifecrises (Paul James Gadsdon and Steph Copson), team homesick (Chris Freestone) from group 1, and Team AUG (Carina Enggård, Kasper Bavnshøj & Kim Merrild Thuesen) made it all the way to Banjul in the Gambia. Only 5 teams from three groups (39 teams), made it that year.

Many teams have completed the challenge more than once, including the "Artful Bodgers", Roger Bruton and Richard Freeman, who entered in January 2006 as an official entrant in the "Plymouth-Banjul Challenge" and again in January 2007 as independents, running alongside the official teams. Managing to source both vehicles for less than £100 and converted by the team from RHD to LHD. Neither vehicle broke down at all and both were donated to charity in the Gambia.

See also
Charity rally
Banger rally
Budapest-Bamako
Mongol Rally

References

External links

Down2Dakar Team Website 2009–2010
Plymouth to Banjul Challenge – successful team
INTO Banjul Challenge 2009

Rally competitions in the Gambia
Road rallying
Automotive events
Plymouth Banjul Challenge
Banjul